The political career of Vladimir Putin concerns the career of Vladimir Putin in politics, including his current tenure as President of Russia.

Saint Petersburg administration (1990–1996)
In May 1990, Putin was appointed Mayor Sobchak's advisor on international affairs. On 28 June 1991, he was appointed head of the Committee for External Relations of the Saint Petersburg Mayor's Office, with responsibility for promoting international relations and foreign investments. The Committee also registered business ventures in Saint Petersburg. Less than one year later, Putin was investigated by a commission of the city legislative council. Commission deputies Marina Salye and Yury Gladkov concluded that Putin understated prices and permitted the export of metals valued at $93 million, in exchange for foreign food aid that never arrived. Despite the commission's recommendation that Putin be fired, Putin remained head of the Committee for External Relations until 1996.

From 1994 to 1997, Putin was appointed to other positions in Saint Petersburg. In March 1994, he became first deputy head of the city administration. From 1995 through June 1997, he led the Saint Petersburg branch of the pro-government Our Home Is Russia political party. From 1995 through June 1996 he was also the head of the advisory board of the JSC Newspaper Sankt-Peterburgskie Vedomosti.

Moscow career (1996–1999)

In 1996, Anatoly Sobchak lost the Saint Petersburg mayoral election to Vladimir Yakovlev. Putin was called to Moscow and in June 1996 became a Deputy Chief of the Presidential Property Management Department headed by Pavel Borodin. He occupied this position until March 1997. During his tenure Putin was responsible for the foreign property of the state and organized transfer of the former assets of the Soviet Union and Communist Party to the Russian Federation.

On 26 March 1997, President Boris Yeltsin appointed Putin deputy chief of Presidential Staff, which he remained until May 1998, and chief of the Main Control Directorate of the Presidential Property Management Department (until June 1998). His predecessor in this position was Alexei Kudrin and the successor was Nikolai Patrushev, both future prominent politicians and Putin's associates.

On 27 June 1997, at the Saint Petersburg Mining Institute, guided by rector Vladimir Litvinenko, Putin defended his Candidate of Science dissertation in economics, titled "The Strategic Planning of Regional Resources Under the Formation of Market Relations". When Putin later became president, the dissertation became a target of plagiarism accusations by fellows at the Brookings Institution, Igor Danchenko and Clifford G. Gaddy; though the allegedly plagiarised study was referenced to the authors of the allegation felt sure it constituted plagiarism, though they were unsure as to whether it was "intentional"; the dissertation committee denied the accusations. In his dissertation, and in a later article published in 1999, Putin advocated the idea of so-called National champions, a concept that would later become central to his political thinking.

On 25 May 1998, Putin was appointed First Deputy Chief of Presidential Staff for regions, replacing Viktoriya Mitina; and, on 15 July, the Head of the Commission for the preparation of agreements on the delimitation of power of regions and the federal center attached to the President, replacing Sergey Shakhray. After Putin's appointment, the commission completed no such agreements, although during Shakhray's term as the Head of the Commission there were 46 agreements signed. Later, after becoming President, Putin canceled all previous delimitation agreements.

On 25 July 1998, Yeltsin appointed Vladimir Putin head of the FSB (one of the successor agencies to the KGB), a position Putin occupied until August 1999. He became a permanent member of the Security Council of the Russian Federation on 1 October 1998 and its Secretary on 29 March 1999.

First Premiership (1999)

On 9 August 1999, Vladimir Putin was appointed one of three First Deputy Prime Ministers, which enabled him later on that day, as the previous government led by Sergei Stepashin had been sacked, to be appointed acting Prime Minister of the Government of the Russian Federation by President Boris Yeltsin. Yeltsin also announced that he wanted to see Putin as his successor. Later, that same day, Putin agreed to run for the presidency. On 16 August, the State Duma approved his appointment as Prime Minister with 233 votes in favour (vs. 84 against, 17 abstained), while a simple majority of 226 was required, making him Russia's fifth PM in fewer than eighteen months. On his appointment, few expected Putin, virtually unknown to the general public, to last any longer than his predecessors. He was initially regarded as a Yeltsin loyalist; like other prime ministers of Boris Yeltsin, Putin did not choose ministers himself, his cabinet being determined by the presidential administration.

Yeltsin's main opponents and would-be successors, Moscow Mayor Yury Luzhkov and former Chairman of the Russian Government Yevgeny Primakov, were already campaigning to replace the ailing president, and they fought hard to prevent Putin's emergence as a potential successor. Putin's law-and-order image and his unrelenting approach to the renewed crisis in the North Caucasus, which started when the Islamic International Brigade based in Chechnya invaded a neighboring region starting the War in Dagestan, soon combined to raise Putin's popularity and allowed him to overtake all rivals.

While not associated with any party, Putin pledged his support to the newly formed Unity Party, which won the second largest percentage of the popular vote (23.3%) in the December 1999 Duma elections, and in turn he was supported by it.

Acting Presidency (1999–2000)

On 31 December 1999, Yeltsin unexpectedly resigned and, according to the constitution, Putin became Acting President of the Russian Federation. On assuming this role, Putin went on a previously scheduled visit to Russian troops in Chechnya.

The first Presidential Decree that Putin signed, on 31 December 1999, was titled "On guarantees for former president of the Russian Federation and members of his family". This ensured that "corruption charges against the outgoing President and his relatives" would not be pursued, although this claim is not strictly verifiable. Later, on 12 February 2001, Putin signed a federal law on guarantees for former presidents and their families, which replaced the similar decree.

While his opponents had been preparing for an election in June 2000, Yeltsin's resignation resulted in the Presidential elections being held within three months, on 26 March 2000; Putin won in the first round with 53% of the vote.

First Presidential term (2000–2004)
Vladimir Putin was inaugurated president on 7 May 2000. He appointed Minister of Finance Mikhail Kasyanov as his Prime minister. Having announced his intention to consolidate power in the country into a strict vertical, in May 2000 he issued a decree dividing 89 federal subjects of Russia between 7 federal districts overseen by representatives of his in order to facilitate federal administration.

During his first term in office, he moved to curb the political ambitions of some of the Yeltsin-era oligarchs such as former Kremlin insider Boris Berezovsky, who had "helped Mr. Putin enter the family, and funded the party that formed Mr. Putin's parliamentary base", according to a BBC profile. At the same time, according to Vladimir Solovyev, it was Alexey Kudrin who was instrumental in Putin's assignment to the Presidential Administration of Russia to work with Pavel Borodin, and according to Solovyev, Berezovsky was proposing Igor Ivanov rather than Putin as a new president.

Between 2000 and 2004, and ending following the Yukos-affair, Putin apparently won a power-struggle with the oligarchs, reaching a 'grand-bargain' with them. This bargain allowed the oligarchs to maintain most of their powers, in exchange for their explicit support and alignment with his government.

A new group of business magnates, such as Gennady Timchenko, Vladimir Yakunin, Yuriy Kovalchuk, Sergey Chemezov, with close personal ties to Putin, also emerged.

Russia's legal reform continued productively during Putin's first term. In particular, Putin succeeded in the codification of land law and tax law, where progress had been slow during Yeltsin's administration, because of Communist and oligarch opposition, respectively. Other legal reforms included new codes on labour, administrative, criminal, commercial and civil procedural law, as well as a major statute on the Bar.

The first major challenge to Putin's popularity came in August 2000, when he was criticised for his alleged mishandling of the Kursk submarine disaster.

In December 2000, Putin sanctioned the law to change the National anthem of Russia. At the time, the Anthem had music by Glinka and no words. The change was to restore (with a minor modification) the music of the post-1944 Soviet anthem by Alexandrov, while the new text was composed by Sergey Mikhalkov, who previously had authored the lyrics of the two versions of the Soviet anthem.

Many in the Russian press and in the international media warned that the death of some 130 hostages in the special forces' rescue operation during the 2002 Moscow theater hostage crisis would severely damage President Putin's popularity. However, shortly after the siege had ended, the Russian president was enjoying record public approval ratings – 83% of Russians declared themselves satisfied with Putin and his handling of the siege.

A few months before the elections, Putin fired Kasyanov's cabinet and appointed Mikhail Fradkov in his place. Sergei Ivanov became the first ever civilian in Russia to hold the title of Defense Minister.

In 2003, a referendum was held in Chechnya on the adoption of a new constitution which declares the Republic as a part of Russia. Chechnya has been gradually stabilized with the establishment of parliamentary elections and a regional government. Throughout the war, Russia had severely disabled the Chechen rebel movement, although sporadic violence continued to occur throughout the North Caucasus.

Second Presidential term (2004–2008)

On 14 March 2004, Putin was elected to the presidency for a second term, receiving 71% of the vote.

The Beslan school hostage crisis took place in September 2004, in which hundreds died. Among the administrative measures taken after that terrorist act, Putin launched an initiative to replace the direct election of the Governors and Presidents of the Federal subjects of Russia with a system whereby they would be nominated by the President and approved or disapproved by regional legislatures. In 2005 Putin created the Public Chamber of Russia.

In 2005, the National Priority Projects were launched to improve Russia's health care, education, housing and agriculture. The most high-profile change within the national priority project frameworks was probably the 2006 across-the-board increase in wages in healthcare and education, as well as the decision to modernise equipment in both sectors in 2006 and 2007. In his May 2006 annual speech, Putin announced increasing maternity benefits and state support of prenatal care for women. By 2012, the demographic programmes of the government led to a 45% increase in second child births by women, and a 60% increase in third, fourth, etc. births.

The continued criminal prosecution of Russia's richest man, President of YUKOS company Mikhail Khodorkovsky, for fraud and tax evasion was seen by the international press as a retaliation for Khodorkovsky's donations to both liberal and communist opponents of the Kremlin. The government said that Khodorkovsky was corrupting a large segment of the Duma to prevent tax code changes such as taxes on windfall profits and closing offshore tax evasion vehicles. Khodorkovsky was arrested, Yukos was bankrupted and the company's assets were auctioned at below-market value, with the largest share acquired by the state company Rosneft. The fate of Yukos was seen in the West as a sign of a broader shift of Russia towards a system of state capitalism.

A study by Bank of Finland's Institute for Economies in Transition (BOFIT) in 2008 found that state intervention had made a positive impact on the corporate governance of many companies in Russia: the governance was better in companies with state control or with a stake held by the government.

Putin was criticized in the West and also by Russian liberals for what many observers considered a wide-scale crackdown on media freedom in Russia. On 7 October 2006, Anna Politkovskaya, a journalist who exposed corruption in the Russian army and its conduct in Chechnya, was shot in the lobby of her apartment building. The death of Politkovskaya triggered an outcry in Western media, with accusations that, at best, Putin has failed to protect the country's new independent media. When asked about the Politkovskaya murder in his interview with the German TV channel ARD, Putin said that her murder brings much more harm to the Russian authorities than her writing. By 2012, the performers of the murder were arrested and named Boris Berezovsky and Akhmed Zakayev as a possible clients.

In 2007, "Dissenters' Marches" were organized by the opposition group The Other Russia, led by former chess champion Garry Kasparov and national-Bolshevist leader Eduard Limonov. Following prior warnings, demonstrations in several Russian cities were met by police action, which included interfering with the travel of the protesters and the arrests of as many as 150 people who attempted to break through police lines. The Dissenters' Marches have received little support among the Russian general public, according to polls.

On 12 September 2007, Putin dissolved the government upon the request of Prime Minister Mikhail Fradkov. Fradkov commented that it was to give the President a "free hand" in the run-up to the parliamentary election. Viktor Zubkov was appointed the new prime minister.

In December 2007, United Russia won 64.24% of the popular vote in their run for State Duma according to election preliminary results. United Russia's victory in the December 2007 elections was seen by many as an indication of strong popular support of the then Russian leadership and its policies.

On 8 February 2008, Putin delivered a speech before the expanded session of the State Council headlined "On the Strategy of Russia's Development until 2020". In his last days in office, Putin was reported to have taken a series of steps to re-align the regional bureaucracy to make the governors report to the prime minister rather than the president. The presidential site explained that "the changes... bear a refining nature and do not affect the essential positions of the system. The key role in estimating the effectiveness of activity of regional authority still belongs to President of the Russian Federation."

Second Premiership (2008–2012)

Putin was barred from a third term by the Constitution. First Deputy Prime Minister Dmitry Medvedev was elected his successor. On 8 May 2008, only a day after handing the presidency to Medvedev, Putin was appointed Prime Minister of Russia, maintaining his political dominance.

The Great Recession hit the Russian economy especially hard, interrupting the flow of cheap Western credit and investments. This coincided with tension in relationships with the EU and the U.S. following the 2008 South Ossetia war, in which Russia defeated a small force in Georgia due to its hopes to join NATO.

However, the large financial reserves, accumulated in the Stabilization Fund of Russia in the previous period of high oil prices, alongside the strong management helped the country to cope with the crisis and resume economic growth since mid-2009. The Russian government's anti-crisis measures have been praised by the World Bank, which said in its Russia Economic Report from November 2008: "prudent fiscal management and substantial financial reserves have protected Russia from deeper consequences of this external shock. The government's policy response so far—swift, comprehensive, and coordinated—has helped limit the impact." Putin himself named the overcoming of consequences of the world economic crisis one of the two main achievements of his 2nd Premiership (the other named achievement being the stabilisation of the size of Russia's population between 2008 and 2011 following the long period of demographic collapse started in the 1990s).

At the United Russia Congress in Moscow on 24 September 2011, Medvedev officially proposed that Putin stand for the Presidency in 2012; an offer which Putin accepted. Given United Russia's near-total dominance of Russian politics, many observers believed that Putin was all but assured of a third term. The move was expected to see Medvedev stand on the United Russia ticket in the parliamentary elections in December, with a goal of becoming Prime Minister at the end of his presidential term.  During the 2012 presidential campaign, Putin published 7 articles to present his vision for the future.

After the parliamentary elections on 4 December 2011, tens of thousands Russians engaged in protests against alleged electoral fraud, the largest protests in Putin's time; protesters criticized Putin and United Russia and demanded annulment of the election results. However, those protests, organized by the leaders of the Russian non-systemic opposition, sparked the fear of a colour revolution in society, and a number of "anti-Orange" counter-protests (the name alludes to the Orange Revolution in Ukraine) and rallies of Putin supporters were carried out, surpassing in scale the opposition protests.

Third Presidential term (2012–2018)

On 4 March 2012, Putin won the 2012 Russian presidential elections in the first round, with 63.6% of the vote. While extraordinary measures were taken to make the elections transparent, including the usage of webcams on the vast majority of polling stations, the vote was criticized by Russian opposition and some international bodies for perceived irregularities.. Several heads of states around the world congratulated Putin on winning elections. Chinese Communist Party general secretary Hu Jintao congratulated Vladimir Putin on taking office as Russian president, and wished the Russian people greater achievements in developing their country under Putin's leadership. The Prime Minister of India, Manmohan Singh said "Your success in these elections is an affirmation by the Russian people of your vision of a strong, prosperous and democratic Russia," and added that he "deeply appreciated the personal commitment and attention that you have brought to nurturing the India-Russia strategic partnership over the last 12 years". The President of Pakistan, Asif Ali Zardari called the election results a "resounding victory". Venezuela President Hugo Chavez personally congratulated Putin on his victory, calling Putin "a driving force behind strategic ties of cooperation between Venezuela and Russia."

Anti-Putin protests took place during and directly after the presidential campaign.  The most notorious protest was the 21 February Pussy Riot performance, and subsequent trial. Also, an estimated 8,000-20,000 protesters gathered in Moscow on 6 May, when eighty people were injured in confrontations with police, and 450 were arrested, with another 120 arrests taking place the following day.

Putin was inaugurated in the Kremlin on 7 May 2012.  On his first day as President, Putin issued 14 Presidential decrees, including a lengthy one stating wide-ranging goals for the Russian economy. Other decrees concerned education, housing, skilled-labor training, relations with the European Union, the defense industry, inter-ethnic relations, and other policy areas dealt with in Putin's programme articles issued during the Presidential campaign.

In 2012 and 2013, Putin and the United Russia backed stricter legislation against the rights of the LGBT community in Russia, first in Saint Petersburg, Archangelsk and Novosibirsk, but a law against "homosexual propaganda" (which prohibits such symbols as the rainbow flag as well as published works containing homosexual content) was adopted by State Duma in June 2013.

In June 2013, Putin attended a televised rally of the All-Russia People's Front where he was elected head of the movement, which was set up in 2011. According to journalist Steve Rosenberg, the movement is intended to "reconnect the Kremlin to the Russian people" and one day, if necessary, replace the increasingly unpopular United Russia party that currently backs Putin.

Fourth Presidential term (2018–2024)

On 18 March 2018, Putin won the 2018 presidential election in the first round, with 76% of the vote. Unlike the 2012 election, in 2018 Putin run as independent candidate, but was endorsed by 14 political parties, including parliamentary United Russia and A Just Russia parties. Putin was inaugurated in the Kremlin on 7 May 2018.

See also
Russia under Vladimir Putin
Vladimir Putin's First Cabinet
Vladimir Putin's Second Cabinet
List of Vladimir Putin legislation and programs

References and notes

Vladimir Putin
Putin, Vladimir
Putin, Vladimir
History of Russia (1991–present)